Love's Crucible is a 1916 American film directed by Emile Chautard based on the play The Point of View by Jules Eckert Goodman. The film stars Frances Nelson.

References

External links

1916 films
Silent American drama films
1916 drama films
American silent short films
American black-and-white films
1910s American films